Leslie Monod (born  1976) is a Swiss former pair skater. With Cédric Monod, she is a three-time Swiss national champion (1992–94) and placed as high as sixth at the European Championships (1993).

Personal life 
Born  1976, Leslie Monod is the younger sister of Cédric Monod. She married Christophe Mounoud, with whom she has two children, Taotim and Natoé. She is a pediatrician.

Skating career 
Leslie Monod competed in pairs with her brother, Cédric. They represented Switzerland internationally and CP Lausanne in domestic events. Their coaches included Heidemarie Steiner and Jacques Mrozek. 

The Monod siblings won the first of their three Swiss national titles in 1992. They finished 8th at the 1992 European Championships in Lausanne and 12th at the 1992 World Championships in Oakland, California. The following season, they placed sixth at the 1993 European Championships in Helsinki and 9th at the 1993 World Championships in Prague. Their Worlds result allowed Switzerland to send two pair teams to the 1994 Winter Olympics.

In the 1993–94 season, the Monod siblings won their third national title but finished just out of the top ten, in 11th place, at the 1994 European Championships in Copenhagen. Following the Copenhagen result, the Swiss Olympic Association elected not to send them to the Olympics. The pair announced their competitive retirement on 3 February 1994.

Programs 
(with Cédric Monod)

Competitive highlights 
(with Cédric Monod)

References 

1970s births
Swiss female pair skaters
Living people
Sportspeople from Lausanne